Dalek Dash (also Romanized as Dalek Dāsh; also known as Delīk Dāsh) is a village in Vardasht Rural District, in the Central District of Semirom County, Isfahan Province, Iran. At the 2006 census, its population was 47, in 9 families.

References 

Populated places in Semirom County